Tabula Rasa (Latin: Blank Slate) is the fourth studio album by Nigerian singer Brymo, released independently on October 30, 2014. It is the follow-up to his third studio album, Merchants, Dealers & Slaves (2013). Moreover, it is the second album released by the singer since the Federal High Court of Lagos lifted Chocolate City's injunction against him. The album's lyrical content explores the recurring theme of freedom, and its release was preceded by the single "Fe Mi". Critical reception to Tabula Rasa was overwhelmingly positive, with many critics deeming it a "classic".

Background
Brymo started recording Tabula Rasa after releasing his third studio album, Merchants, Dealers & Slaves (2013). Sammy Sage Hasson was originally announced as the only artist that would be featured on the album. Brymo's manager, Lanre Lawal, told The Punch that Brymo was working on an album for 2014. Brymo decided to name the album Tabula Rasa after hearing the phrase in a speech made by the judge who resided over his court injunction case.

Composition
On the album's opener "Back to Love", Brymo expresses himself spiritually, emotionally and creatively. In "Fe Mi", he pleads for physical love; the song features a guitar riff and rhythmic claps. "Prick No Get Shoulder", a metaphor for enjoying life's pleasures with caution, depicts a condition of being. Music critic Michael Kolawole praised Brymo for "weaving and juxtaposing long-winded cautious narratives about self-responsibility on the track". In "Dear Child", Brymo narrates the fickleness of life and the unconditional love between a grandmother and her grandchild. "Ję Lé O Sinmi" (Yoruba: Kindergarten) is a memoir of Brymo's past as an innocent child in the daycare to that of a mature man. "Alone" is a spoken word track about discovering one's self. "Never Look Back" is a compelling charge to owning up and taking responsibility. In "Jungle Fever", Brymo sings about the unrest of the populace; the latter part of the song is a metaphor for being angry at the status quo. "1 Pound" is an Afrobeat song with trademark horns and meandering guitar licks. "Again" is a song about starting love all over again; it is composed of grand drums and a choir-like hum.

Singles and other releases
"Fe Mi" was released as the album's lead single on September 18, 2014. Ayo Onikoyi of Vanguard describes the song as "a soft   traditional ballad". On March 6, 2015, Brymo released the St. Immaculate-directed documentary video for the song "1 Pound"; a teaser of the video was released on March 2, 2015. Brymo premiered the video on Pulse Nigeria and said the song is about informing people about local and international currencies. On March 30, 2015, he released the Godson KC Uma-directed music video for the song "Ję Lé O Sinmi".

Critical reception

Tabula Rasa received positive critical acclaim from music critics and consumers.  Tola Sarumi of NotJustOk gave the album a perfect rating of 10/10, praising Brymo's delivery and performance. Jim Donnett granted the album 4.5 stars out of 5, describing it as a "brilliant compositional effort made to evoke one's senses." Ayomide Tayo of Pulse Nigeria awarded the album 4.5 stars out of 5, commending its quality, production and sound.

A writer for TayoTV commented on the album, stating, "his songs may not focus as much on partying, women, and drinking, but as times change so does music. He is still having fun, whether singing a ballad, doing spoken words, or just letting everyone know how much ass he kicks". The duo at Should You Bump This said Tabula Rasa is a "must have for music lovers worldwide" and opined that Brymo is "hands down the best male artiste in Nigeria." A writer for the music blog Jaguda awarded the album a score of 9 out of 10, describing it as "a genuine gift to all lovers of good music."

Track listing

Release history

References

2014 albums
Brymo albums
Yoruba-language albums